Rulon Kent Jones (born March 25, 1958 in Salt Lake City, Utah) is a retired American football defensive end.

Jones was drafted out of the Utah State University in the 1980 NFL Draft by the Denver Broncos. He played his entire career in Denver. During his career, Jones played in 129 games and recorded 52.5 official quarterback sacks.

During the 1986 season, he was named the UPI AFL-AFC Player of the Year on defense.

Rulon Davis was named after Jones and would also go on to play with the Broncos in the 2000s. Jones retired after the 1988 season.

Personal

Jones now lives in Firth, Idaho with his wife, Kathy.

References

External links
Career stats
Career stats

1958 births
Living people
Denver Broncos players
American Conference Pro Bowl players
Utah State Aggies football players
Players of American football from Salt Lake City
Ed Block Courage Award recipients